, based in Kobe, is one of the largest supermarket chains in Japan. In 1957, Isao Nakauchi founded the chain in Osaka near Sembayashi Station on the Keihan train line. Daiei is now under a restructuring process supported by Marubeni Corporation and ÆON Co., Ltd., another Japanese supermarket chain. Daiei Inc. runs more than 3,000 stores under the Daiei name as well as through its subsidiaries.
In addition to groceries, Daiei is also a department store, selling electronics, home furnishings, and clothes. In terms of net sales, Daiei was formerly the largest retailer in Japan. However, total sales declined by nearly a quarter in the five years leading up to 2003.

History
The retail chain expanded rapidly in the 1970s and 1980s. Also, stronger sales from competitors such as Ito-Yokado, ÆON, and other regional supermarket chains have hurt Daiei's sales record in recent years.

As a part of the series of bootstrap restructuring efforts to avoid filing for IRCJ (Industrial Revitalization Corporation of Japan) support, the company sold its baseball team, the Fukuoka Daiei Hawks, which it purchased from Nankai Railway in 1988 to SoftBank, on January 27, 2005 and the company's Hawaii stores in 2006 to Don Quijote Co., Ltd. Through the process of debt restructuring and support given by financial institutions in coordination with IRCJ, the company has been acquired by IRCJ, Marubeni Corporation (a trading company) and Advantage Partners (a private equity house) in 2005.

Daiei's current President and CEO is Toru Nishimi, formerly an operating officer of Marubeni Corporation.

Private Brand 

Daiei carries multiple private label brands, and the biggest one they carry is Topvalu (トップバリュ) which started in 2007. Topvalu products are sold by ÆON Co., Ltd. and Daiei.

See also

 Zombie company
 OPA co. ltd.

References

External links
 Daiei Official site 
 "'Zombie' Businesses", The New York Times
  Wiki collection of bibliographic works on Daiei

Retail companies established in 1957
Department stores of Japan
Japanese supermarkets
Supermarkets of Japan
Japanese brands
Companies based in Kobe
Companies listed on the Tokyo Stock Exchange
1957 establishments in Japan